DXRJ (88.5 FM) is a relay station of RJFM Manila, owned and operated by Rajah Broadcasting Network through its licensee Free Air Broadcasting Network, Inc. The station's transmitter is located at Pryce Plaza Hotel, Carmen Hill, Cagayan de Oro.

References

External links
RJFM FB Page

Radio stations in Cagayan de Oro
Oldies radio stations in the Philippines
Radio stations established in 1987